The Czech Olympic Committee is the National Olympic Committee (NOC) representing the Czech Republic.

History
The Czech Olympic Committee is one of the oldest NOCs in the world, having been founded in 1899 as Bohemian Committee for the Olympic Games. It was transformed into the Czechoslovak Olympic Committee in 1919 and reconstituted under its original name in 1992, being formally recognized by the IOC again in 1993.

Presidents
The Czech Olympic Committee has had the following presidents:

Executive committee
 President: Jiří Kejval
 Vice Presidents: Roman Kumpost, Zdenek Hanik, Filip Suman, Libor Varhanik
 Secretary General: Petr Graclik

Member federations
The Czech National Federations are the organizations that coordinate all aspects of their individual sports. They are responsible for training, competition and development of their sports. There are currently 34 Olympic Summer and 8 Winter Sport Federations in Czech Republic.

See also
 Bohemia at the Olympics
 Czech Republic at the Olympics

External links
 Official website

National Olympic Committees
Olympic Committee
1899 establishments in Austria-Hungary
Olympic

Sports organizations established in 1899